Kettleborough is an English surname. Notable people with the surname include:

James Kettleborough (born 1992), English cricketer
Keith Kettleborough (1935–2009), English footballer
Richard Kettleborough (born 1973), English cricketer and umpire

English-language surnames